Richard Kingsford  is an environmental/biological expert and river ecologist. Much of his work has been undertaken with the Murray-Darling Basin wetlands and rivers covering approximately 70 percent of the Australian continent. He is the director of the Centre for Ecosystem Science at the University of New South Wales School of Biological, Earth and Environmental Sciences, a member of the Australian Government’s Environmental Flows Scientific Committee. He has received the following awards:
 2001: Eureka Award for his research on ecological values of rivers and impact of Australia’s water resource aridity;
 2007: Hoffman medal for his contribution to global wetland science;
 2008: Eureka Award for Promoting Understanding of Science;
 2015: Eureka Award (as a member of the IUCN Red List of Ecosystems team) for Environmental Research resulting in the establishment of a universal standard for assessing ecosystem risks;
 2019: Society for Conservation Biology’s Distinguished Service Award also relating to contributions to freshwater/ecosystem conservation;
2020: Fellow of the Royal Society of New South Wales.

Kingsford presented "A Meander Down a River or Two: How Water Defines Our Continent and Its Future" for the second Eric Rolls Memorial Lecture in 2012.

In 2019 the Australian Regional Council (ARC) appointed Kingsford as chief investigator in a team to develop a new international standard for the appraisal and reporting of the status of the most crucial wetlands worldwide.

Publications 
His most cited publication, Kingsford, Richard Tennant. "Ecological impacts of dams, water diversions and river management on floodplain wetlands in Australia." Australian Ecology 25.2 (2000): 109-127.m has been cited 985 times, according to Google Scholar.

References 

Australian ecologists
Environmental scientists
Living people
Year of birth missing (living people)
Fellows of the Royal Society of New South Wales